Jean-Jacques Lagrenée (18 September 1739 in Paris – 13 February 1821 in Paris), known as the younger, was a French history painter and engraver.  With his elder brother Louis-Jean-François Lagrenée, he stayed in Russia (1760–62) then at the Académie de Rome (1763–68).

1739 births
1821 deaths
18th-century French painters
French male painters
19th-century French painters
Painters from Paris
19th-century French male artists
18th-century French male artists